Marcel Burkhard (born 27 December 1951) is a Swiss judoka. He competed at the 1972 Summer Olympics and the 1980 Summer Olympics.

References

1951 births
Living people
Swiss male judoka
Olympic judoka of Switzerland
Judoka at the 1972 Summer Olympics
Judoka at the 1980 Summer Olympics
Place of birth missing (living people)
20th-century Swiss people